Aap Ki Khatir (for your sake) is a 1977 Bollywood film, produced by Harsh Kohli and directed by Sudhendu Roy.  The stars are Vinod Khanna, Rekha, Helen and Om Shivpuri. The film's music is by Bappi Lahiri.  The last song in the film "Bombay se Aaya Mera Dost" became a memorable hit.  The film is a remake of the American film For Pete's Sake (1974), starring Barbra Streisand.

Plot

Sagar (Vinod Khanna) defies his wealthy family by marrying a poor girl named Sarita (Rekha) and therefore is cut out of his family's inheritance.  He then decides to make a living by driving a cab.  Sarita feels guilty that he left his wealth behind to marry her.  She raises Rs.10,000 from a loan shark but lies to her husband saying she got it from her uncle.  She then asks her husband to give the money to a stockbroker friend to invest.  When the investment doesn't result in healthy dividends, Sarita becomes desperate to raise the money to repay the loan shark.  She inadvertently gets hooked up with a madam (Nadira) who sends clients to her apartment.  Sarita gets into humorous incidents as she avoids contact with her male clients.

Cast
 Vinod Khanna as Sagar 
 Rekha as Sarita 
 Helen as Shola
 Om Shivpuri as Suraj 
 Nadira as Shanti
 Mac Mohan as Mac
 Tun Tun as Dancer / Singer 
 Asrani as Bhola 
 Tarun Ghosh as Hazarimal 
 Murad as Sagar's Father   
 Sonia Sahni as Suraj's Wife

Soundtrack

References

External links 
 

1977 films
Indian romantic comedy films
1970s Hindi-language films
Films scored by Bappi Lahiri
Indian remakes of American films
Films directed by Sudhendu Roy